Conus fuscoflavus is a species of sea snail, a marine gastropod mollusk in the family Conidae, the cone snails and their allies.

Like all species within the genus Conus, these snails are predatory and venomous. They are capable of "stinging" humans, therefore live ones should be handled carefully or not at all.

Description
The size of an adult shell varies between 15 mm and 28 mm.

Distribution
This marine species is found in the Atlantic Ocean off the Cape Verdes.

References

 Filmer R.M. (2001). A Catalogue of Nomenclature and Taxonomy in the Living Conidae 1758 - 1998. Backhuys Publishers, Leiden. 388pp.
 Tucker J.K. (2009). Recent cone species database. 4 September 2009 Edition
 Tucker J.K. & Tenorio M.J. (2009) Systematic classification of Recent and fossil conoidean gastropods. Hackenheim: Conchbooks. 296 pp\

External links
 The Conus Biodiversity website
 
 Cone Shells – Knights of the Sea
  Puillandre N., Duda T.F., Meyer C., Olivera B.M. & Bouchet P. (2015). One, four or 100 genera? A new classification of the cone snails. Journal of Molluscan Studies. 81: 1–23

fuscoflavus
Gastropods of Cape Verde
Endemic fauna of Cape Verde
Gastropods described in 1980